Juego del garrote (stick game) or juego del garrote  ('stick game of Lara') is a Venezuelan martial art that involves machete, stick-fighting, and knife fencing.  It is most associated with the Venezuelan state of Lara.

References 

Stick-fighting
Venezuelan martial arts